Converse County Airport  is three miles north of Douglas, Wyoming, in Converse County, which owns it.

Facilities
It has two asphalt runways: 11/29 is 6,534 by 100 feet (1,992 x 30 m) and 5/23 is 4,760 by 75 feet (1,451 x 23 m). Two helipads, H1 and H2, are each 60 by 60 feet (18 x 18 m).

In the year ending May 31, 2020 the airport had 4,854 aircraft operations, average 13 per day: 97% general aviation, 2% air taxi and <1% military. 30 aircraft were then based at the airport: 28 single-engine and 2 multi-engine.

References

External links 
 Aerial photo as of 11 June 1994 from USGS The National Map
 

Airports in Wyoming
Transportation in Converse County, Wyoming
Buildings and structures in Converse County, Wyoming